Severus Gastorius (1646-1682) was a cantor in Jena, Thuringia.

The son of a Weimar school teacher, Severus was born with the family name Bauchspiess (later Latinised to Gastorius) in Oettern, near Weimar. In 1667, he started studying at the University of Jena. From 1670, he deputized for cantor Andreas Zöll in Jena and married his daughter the following year. Gastorius assumed Zöll's position after his death in 1677.  One of his friends, Samuel Rodigast, wrote the hymn "Was Gott tut, das ist wohlgetan" for Gastorius when he was sick (to cheer him up as Rodigast writes in his dedication). Even before he recovered, Gastorius set it to music based on a melody by Werner Fabricius. The cantor's students sang it every week at Gastorius' door, on his request, as well as when they returned home. The hymn became widely known in Germany.

Gastorius was buried on 8 May 1682 in Jena's Johanniskirche cemetery. Gastorius had requested that the hymn "Was Gott tut, das ist wohlgetan" be sung at his funeral.

Gastorius is also credited with composing music for the funeral motet Du aber gehe hin bis das Ende komme. It was sung at the funeral of the Jena professor of medicine Johann Arnold Friderici on 2 June 1672.

References
The article is largely based on Wikipedia's Swedish version.

External links 
Details of Gastorius' Was Gott tut, das ist wohlgetan with translation

Bibliography
 Reinhold Jauernig, Severus Gastorius, in:  8, 1963, p. 163 et seq. 
 Siegfried Fornaçon, Werke von Severus Gastorius, in: Jahrbuch für Liturgik und Hymnologie 8, 1963, p. 165-171. 

German Protestant hymnwriters
German classical composers
German male classical composers
German male singers
1647 births
1682 deaths
17th-century classical composers
17th-century hymnwriters
17th-century male musicians